Richard Legh (7 May 1634 – 31 August 1687) was an English politician who sat in the House of Commons  variously between 1656 and 1678.

Legh was the son of Rev. Thomas Legh, DD of Cheshire and rector of Sefton and Walton, Lancashire. He inherited the Lyme Park estate in Cheshire from his uncle Francis Legh in 1643. He was educated at  Winwick, Lancashire and admitted at St John's College, Cambridge on 18 June 1649.  He was admitted at Gray's Inn on 23 May 1653.

In 1656, Legh was elected Member of Parliament for Cheshire in the Second Protectorate Parliament and was re-elected in 1659 for the Third Protectorate Parliament.

In 1660, Legh was elected MP for Newton in the Convention Parliament and was re-elected in 1661 for the Cavalier Parliament. He held the seat until 1679.

Legh died at the age of 53 at Lyme Cheshire and was buried at Winwick, Lancashire.

Legh married Elizabeth Chicheley, daughter of Sir Thomas Chicheley, of Wimpole, Cambridgeshire.

References

1634 births
1687 deaths
Alumni of St John's College, Cambridge
Members of Gray's Inn
Members of the Parliament of England (pre-1707) for constituencies in Cheshire
English MPs 1656–1658
English MPs 1659
English MPs 1660
English MPs 1661–1679